Anti-NATO is the group of the Russian second State Duma deputies united by a desire to prevent the inclusion of Eastern Europe in NATO. Anti-NATO was formed in the State Duma in 1997 and included 257 members of the State Duma (out of 450) and 47 members of the Federation Council. It can also mean opposition to and total rejection of NATO.

A majority of Russians were against the NATO bombing of Yugoslavia.

See also
 Controversy in Russia regarding the legitimacy of eastward NATO expansion
 2006 anti-NATO protests in Feodosia
 Withdrawal from NATO

References

External links
"Anti-NATO-enlargement" parliamentary movement

Federal Assembly (Russia)
Opposition to NATO
Russia–NATO relations